Rajesh Kushwaha alias Rajesh Kumar is an Indian politician and a former member of Bihar Legislative Assembly. He was elected to the lower house of Bihar legislature as a candidate of Rashtriya Janata Dal (RJD) in 2015. In 2020, the RJD chose Santosh Kushwaha, replacing him, as party candidate for the Kesaria Assembly constituency. Hence, he constested the Bihar Assembly elections of 2020 as an independent candidate, losing to Shalini Mishra of Janata Dal (United).

Political career
In 2015 assembly elections, he defeated Rajendra Prasad Gupta of Bhartiya Janata Party by getting 62,902 votes ; latter got 46,955 votes. However, in 2020, the constest became tripolar. Kumar was not allotted the symbol of RJD; hence decided to contest independently, without affiliation of any political party. On the other hand, Shalini Mishra on the symbol of Janata Dal (United) and candidates from Rashtriya Lok Samata Party (Maheswar Singh) and Lok Janshakti Party made division of votes inevitable. This led to defeat of Dr. Rajesh Kushwaha. The number of votes cast in his favour stood low.

References

Rashtriya Janata Dal politicians
Living people
Bihar MLAs 2015–2020
People from East Champaran district